Legislative elections happened on June 2, 1931 in the Philippines under the Jones Law provisions.

Electoral system 
In a staggered election, the seats of the senators who were first disputed in 1919 were up for election. The Philippines is divided into 12 senatorial districts, of which all districts save for the 12th district, has one of its seats up. In the 12th district, any vacancy is filled via appointment of the Governor-General. The election itself is via first-past-the-post.

Results

See also
Commission on Elections
Politics of the Philippines
Philippine elections

External links
Official website of the Commission on Elections

1931
1931 elections in the Philippines